Sophie Dessus (24 September 1955 – 3 March 2016) was a Socialist politician from Corrèze, France, representing Corrèze's First Constituency in the National Assembly, the first woman to represent Corrèze in the National Assembly.

References

External links
Dessus's official website, National Assembly. Accessed 11 April 2016. 

1955 births
2016 deaths
People from Suresnes
Socialist Party (France) politicians
Deaths from cancer in France
Women members of the National Assembly (France)
Deputies of the 14th National Assembly of the French Fifth Republic
21st-century French women politicians
Mayors of places in Nouvelle-Aquitaine
University of Limoges alumni